Chelsea Noble is an American actress. She is known for her role as Kate McDonnell on the television sitcom Growing Pains (1989–1992). She is married to her former Growing Pains co-star, Kirk Cameron. She is the sister-in-law of former Full House star Candace Cameron Bure.

Career
Noble appeared in a 1997 episode of Seinfeld titled "The English Patient". She co-starred as Hattie Durham in the Left Behind trilogy with her husband Kirk Cameron. Prior to the "Left Behind" movies Chelsea and Kirk co-starred in A Little Piece of Heaven with Cloris Leachman. She also had several uncredited cameos in films starring Cameron as a "kissing double." Kirk Cameron refused to kiss any woman who was not his wife, so for romantic scenes the actress playing his love interest would be replaced by Noble in an appropriate costume and filmed from a distance or behind. This can be seen in the fire station scene of Fireproof.

In 2014, she co-starred with her husband in the independent movie Mercy Rule, playing a married couple with two children. Although not the first movie in which they have played husband and wife (having done so in two Growing Pains TV movies), this is the first time she has been credited as Chelsea Cameron.

Personal life
Chelsea Noble met Kirk Cameron when he was visiting his little sister Candace on the set of Full House. They later co-starred on Growing Pains together. They dated in real life. The couple got married on July 21, 1991, in Cheektowaga, New York, and have six children — four adopted, two biological. 
Chelsea and Kirk are both Christians. They founded The Firefly Foundation, which runs Camp Firefly.

Filmography

References

External links 
 
 
 
 

Living people
20th-century American actresses
21st-century American actresses
Actresses from New York (state)
American film actresses
American television actresses
People from Cheektowaga, New York
State University of New York at Geneseo alumni
American Christians
Year of birth missing (living people)